Axel Madsen (May 27, 1930 – April 23, 2007) was a Danish-American biographer and journalist.

Born in Copenhagen and raised in Paris, Madsen turned from music to writing in the early 1950s, initially for the Paris edition of the New York Herald Tribune. In 1956 he moved to Canada and began working for United Press International. He moved to Hollywood in the early 1960s and began writing biographies.

Madsen wrote on topics such as cross country truck drivers and the CBS news magazine "60 minutes". He was best known for his biographies of Hollywood celebrities, fashion pioneers, and business titans. Biographies included Billy Wilder, Barbara Stanwyck, Coco Chanel, Greta Garbo, John Jacob Astor, Jacques Cousteau, Yves St. Laurent, André Malraux, Jean-Paul Sartre, Simone de Beauvoir, William C. Durant, William Wyler, and John Huston.

Book
He also wrote a science fiction novel, Unisave (1980).

Family
Madsen was married to Midori.

Death
He died of pancreatic cancer in Los Angeles at the age of 76.

References

Sources
LA Times obituary

1930 births
2007 deaths
American male journalists
Deaths from pancreatic cancer
People from Copenhagen
Journalists from Paris
People from Greater Los Angeles
Deaths from cancer in California
Danish emigrants to the United States
20th-century American biographers
20th-century American journalists
20th-century American male writers
American male biographers